Vought's HVM, short for Hyper-Velocity Missile, was an anti-tank missile  developed during the 1980s. The HVM carried no warhead and killed its targets with kinetic energy alone using a metal rod penetrator. Development as an air-launched weapon for the A-10 Thunderbolt II ended sometime in the late 1980s but continued for helicopter use into the 1990s along with ground-launched (HMMWV) as the larger MGM-166 LOSAT. None of these systems was operationally deployed.

The HVM was intended as a fairly inexpensive weapon, compared to the AGM-65 Maverick at least, offering the standoff performance while requiring a minimum of support electronics. The target was acquired using a FLIR system on the launch vehicle, and after launch the missile quickly accelerated to 1500 m/s (5,000 ft/s, 5,400 km/h, Mach 4.3) and into the view of the FLIR, which tracked both the target and missile from that point on. Corrections to the flight path were sent to the missile via a laser, and the missile included the electronics needed to guide itself back to the correct flight path.

The missile was just under 3 meters long and about 10 cm in diameter. The aft portion was flared out in a cone, which gives it some directional stability without requiring fold-out fins. Most of the stabilization was due to spin. Directional control was accomplished via thrust vectoring. The penetrator was housed under an ogive nose cone.

The contract was initially sent to Vought Missiles and Space in late 1981, and the first unpowered drop tests were carried out in March 1983. A contract for joint development by the US Air Force, US Army and US Marine Corps followed in October 1984, but the Air Force dropped out of the program sometime in the late 1980s (Janes' says '87-'89). In 1988, Texas Instruments and Vought teamed up to enter a modified version of the HVM into the Army's new Advanced Anti-Tank Weapon System – Heavy (AAWS-H) competition, winning it as the MGM-166 LOSAT (or KEM, Kinetic Energy Missile) with a slightly enlarged and finned version of the basic HVM system.

References

External links
 Directory of U.S. Military Rockets and Missiles - Appendix 4: Undesignated Vehicles - HVM Andreas Parsch, 2003

Anti-tank guided missiles of the United States
Abandoned military rocket and missile projects of the United States
Vought